From Bihar To Tihar: My Political Journey is a memoir and political book written by then president of Jawaharlal Nehru University, former Communist Party of India candidate from Begusarai Lok Sabha and presently a politician of Indian National Congress, Kanhaiya Kumar. It was published on 3 October 2016.

Plot 
Kanhaiya Kumar has written about his life from childhood to Tihar Jail in this book.

References 

Political books
Indian books
Political literature